Aegialodon dawsoni is an extinct mammal from the early Cretaceous, known from fossilised teeth discovered in the Wadhurst Clay Formation (dating to about 136 million years ago) near Cliff End, Hastings, East Sussex.

References

Early Cretaceous mammals of Europe
Valanginian genera
Prehistoric mammal genera
Fossil taxa described in 1965